The Countess of Monte Cristo may refer to:

 The Countess of Monte Cristo (1932 film), a German film starring Brigitte Helm
 The Countess of Monte Cristo (1934 film), an American film starring Fay Wray
 The Countess of Monte Cristo (1948 film), an American film starring Sonja Henie

See also
 The Count of Monte Cristo (disambiguation)